The Gathering Wilderness is the fifth studio album by Primordial, released in 2005. It was their debut for the Metal Blade label. The digipak comes with a bonus DVD featuring a documentary detailing the making of the album. The album is in part dedicated to the memory of Quorthon.

Track listing

Credits
 A.A. Nemtheanga – Vocals
 Ciáran MacUiliam – Guitars
 Michael O'Floinn – Guitars
 Pól MacAmlaigh – Bass
 Simon Ó Laoghaire – Drums

References

2005 albums
Primordial (band) albums
Metal Blade Records albums